Ali Omari (born 3 June 1983) is an Afghan footballer. He earned one cap for the Afghanistan national team.

National team statistics

External links

1983 births
Living people
Afghan footballers
Association football defenders
Afghanistan international footballers